MUSA may refer to:

 Manufacturing USA, a network of research institutes in the United States
 Museum of the University of St Andrews
 Cancún Underwater Museum, known as MUSA from its Spanish name, El Museo subaquático de Arte
 San Antonio de los Baños Airfield
 Musa (Ilkhanid dynasty), a Mongol ruler of the 14th century
 Musa (robot), robot that can fight using Kendo
 MUSA (MUltichannel Speaking Automaton), an early computer machine aimed to speech synthesis, built at CSELT starting from 1975

See also
 Musa (disambiguation)